The Deperdussin Monocoque  was an early  racing aircraft built in 1912 by the Aéroplanes Deperdussin, a French aircraft manufacturer started in 1911 and reorganized as the Société Pour L'Aviation et ses Dérivés (SPAD) in 1913. It is so named because of the method of construction of its fuselage.

Background
The first use of monocoque construction in aviation is attributed to Eugene Ruchonnet, a Swiss marine engineer who had built an aircraft nicknamed the Cigare in 1911, which had a fuselage constructed by building up several layers of thin wood, each lamination being applied at right angle to the one underneath. The usual method of construction of an aircraft's fuselage at this time was to use a wire braced box-girder covered in fabric. Ruchonnet's technique, in which the outer surface of the structure is load-bearing, would become the usual method of aircraft construction. A similar method to Ruchonnet's in fuselage construction occurrede a few years later in the wartime German Empire as the Wickelrumpf ("wrapped body") method, patented by the Luft-Fahrzeug-Gesellschaft (L.F.G.) firm in 1915-16, used for the 400 examples produced of the LFG Roland C.II Walfisch two-seat reconnaissance aircraft, and licensed for use from L.F.G. in 1917 by the Pfalz Flugzeugwerke for some of their WW I fighter designs for the Luftstreitkräfte.

Design 
The Deperdussin Monocoque was a mid-wing monoplane with parallel-chord wings with the spars made of hickory and ash, and ribs made of pine. The shells were then removed from the formers, internal fittings added and the two halves glued together and covered in fabric. Every effort was made to reduce drag: a large spinner was fitted  over the hub of the propeller and the undercarriage was an aerodynamically clean design made from a pair of U-shaped plywood frames.

Service history
Jules Védrines won the 1912 Gordon Bennett Trophy race in a Monocoque, with Maurice Prévost coming second in another Monocoque.

Deperdussin entered three aircraft for the 1913 race, which was held as part of the week-long aviation meeting at Rheims in September 1913. Prévost, Eugène Gilbert and Rost were selected in elimination trials to decide the three pilots who would form the French team. A fourth Monocoque was entered by Crombez, representing Belgium. Prévost's aircraft had been modified by reducing the span of the wings. The race was won by Prévost, who completed the  course in 59 min 45.6 seconds, at an average speed of   Védrines was second in a Ponnier monoplane, while Monocoques placed third (Gilbert) and fourth (Crombez).

Appearances in film
A reproduction  made an appearance in the 1978 film The 39 Steps. During the search for Richard Hannay across the English and Scottish countryside, Prussian agents use a Monocoque to hunt for Hannay. The machine does not have a rotary engine but rotary engine sounds are frequently employed while the aircraft is in flight.

Aircraft on display
An example is on display in the French Air and Space Museum at Le Bourget, near Paris.

Specifications (1913 Gordon Bennett winner)

References

Notes

Bibliography
Wayne Biddle - Barons of the Sky: From Early Flight to Strategic Warfare. Johns Hopkins University Press, 2001. .
Émile Auguste Duchêne - Flight Without Formulae: Simple Discussions on the Mechanics of the Aeroplane. Longmans, Green and co., 1914.

Monocoque
Single-engined tractor aircraft
Racing aircraft
1910s French sport aircraft
Mid-wing aircraft
Aircraft first flown in 1912
Rotary-engined aircraft